The Baptist Convention of Panama is a Baptist Christian denomination in Panama. It is affiliated with the Baptist World Alliance. The headquarters is in Burunga.

History
The Baptist Convention of Panama has its origins in an American mission of the International Mission Board in 1905.  It is officially founded in 1959.  According to a denomination census released in 2020, it claimed 117 churches and 4,800 members.

See also
 Bible
 Born again
 Baptist beliefs
 Worship service (evangelicalism)
 Jesus Christ
 Believers' Church

References

External links
 Official Website

Baptist denominations in Central America
Evangelicalism in Panama